Metrogenes is a genus of moths in the Carposinidae family. It contains the single species Metrogenes deltocycla, which is found on Sarawak.

References

Natural History Museum Lepidoptera generic names catalog

Carposinidae
Monotypic moth genera